is a city located in Ibaraki Prefecture, Japan. , the city had an estimated population of 50,282 in 19,353 households and a population density of 765 persons per km2. The percentage of the population aged over 65 was 30.8%.

Geography
Yūki is located in far western Ibaraki Prefecture, bordered by Tochigi Prefecture to the north and west, and separated from the rest of Ibaraki Prefecture by the Kinugawa River. It is closely related to Tochigi Prefecture in terms of culture (such as dialects), economy, and transportation due to the close proximity to the city of Oyama.

Surrounding municipalities
Ibaraki Prefecture
 Chikusei
 Koga
 Yachiyo
Tochigi Prefecture
Oyama

Climate
Yūki has a humid continental climate (per the Köppen climate classification) characterized by warm summers and cool winters with light snowfall.

Demographics
Per Japanese census data, the population of Yūki has remained relatively steady over the past 40 years.

History
The area of Yūki was an important center for the production of cotton, flax and woven goods from the Nara period. From the Kamakura period onwards, the area was controlled by the Yūki clan, who developed a castle town around Yūki Castle. This subsequently became the center of Yūki Domain which was ruled by 10 generations of a junior branch of the Mizuno clan under the Tokugawa shogunate in the Edo period.

The town of Yūki was created with the establishment of the modern municipalities system on April 1, 1889. On March 15, 1954, Yūki merged with the neighboring villages of Yamakawa, Kinugawa, Egawa and Kamiyamakawa and was elevated to city status.

Government
Yūki has a mayor-council form of government with a directly elected mayor and a unicameral city council of 18 members. Yūki contributes one member to the Ibaraki Prefectural Assembly. In terms of national politics, the city is part of Ibaraki 7th district of the lower house of the Diet of Japan.

Economy
Yūki has an industrial park, however, the local economy remains based on agriculture and food processing. The main crops include rice, lettuce, and corn.

Education
Yūki has nine public elementary schools and three public middle schools operated by the city government, and three public high schools operated by the Ibaraki Prefectural Board of Education. The prefectural also operates a special education school for the handicapped.

Transportation

Railway
 JR East –  Mito Line
  -  -

Highway

Sister city relations
 – Mechelen, Belgium, since October 1996

Local attractions
 Site of Yūki Castle
 Grave of Mizuno Tadakuni
 Yūki old town with old warehouses

Noted people from Yūki 
Takeo Fujisawa, co-founder of Honda
Katsumi Hirosawa, baseball player 
Yukie Nakayama, sport shooter

References

External links

Official Website 

Cities in Ibaraki Prefecture
Yūki, Ibaraki